Indu Raj Narwal is an Indian politician who is serving as Member of 14th Haryana Assembly from Baroda Assembly constituency.

Personal life 
He was born in 29 April 1977 in Sonipat district.

References 

Haryana MLAs 2019–2024

1977 births
Living people